Marcelline Picard-Kanapé ,  Marcelline P. Kanapé, (born 1941 in Betsiamites [now Pessamit] in the Côte-Nord region of Quebec) is considered one of the great specialists in education among First Nations in Canada, distinguishing herself since the 1950s. She was the first Innu teacher in Quebec, the first Aboriginal person to serve on the Conseil supérieur de l'éducation, and the first female Innu chief.

Biography
Marcelline Picard-Kanapé is from the Innu community and First Nations reserve of Betsiamites (now Pessamit), near Rimouski, Quebec.  She was the eldest of twelve children.  She was schooled first by the Sisters of Charity and then studied at the École Normale du Bon-Conseil in Chicoutimi. In 1959, at age 18, she obtained a diploma in preschool and elementary school education and became the first Innu teacher in Quebec.  She earned a bachelor's degree in education from the Université du Québec à Chicoutimi (UQAC) in 1988.

Picard-Kanapé taught primary education in Pessamit for two decades and struggled with the curriculum and system that shamed and divided generations of her people. Her dedication to the community saw her elected as an advisor to the Betsiamites Band Council at age 21. She was principal of the Betsiamites Elementary and Secondary School from 1977 to 1984. When control of the school system passed from the Department of Indian Affairs to the Band Council in 1980, she was ready to effect changes including the introduction of Innu language courses. In the process, she helped standardize the Innu language and develop the first Innu–French dictionary.

Picard-Kanapé was Director of Education at Pessamit then at Uashat-Maliotenam while sitting on the Conseil supérieur de l'Éducation du Québec (1989–1992), the first aboriginal person to do so. She was then elected Chief of the Betsiamites Band Council, the first woman to hold such a position. During two successive terms in office (1992–1996) she saw women represented in the community's political bodies.

Picard-Kanapé has also worked to facilitate cooperation between native and non-native peoples, taking part in many conferences and forums and in the creation of books on the subject. She sat on the board of directors of the Montagnais Cultural and Edutational Institute and evaluated the teacher training program at UQAC. She co-founded the Khani-Khant Choir and Native Dance troupes.

The Université du Québec's National Institute of Scientific Research awarded Picard-Kanapé an honorary doctorate in 2004. In 2006 she was appointed to the board of directors of the Côte-Nord Health and Social Services Agency, also sitting on its ethics and professional conduct committee. She later sat on the board of governors of the Université du Québec.

Professional experience
2012–2014: Vice-Chief at the Innu Council of Pessamit
1998–2006: Director Uashkaikan Secondary School of Pessamit
1997–1998: Director Otapi High School, Manawan
1992–1996: Chief of the band council of Pessamit
1989–1992: Director of Education Uashat-Maliotenam
1988: Responsible for dissemination and workshops on the standardization of Montagnais (Innu) spelling at Atikameku - Montagnais Educational and Cultural Institute
1984–1987: Director of Education Pessamit
1977–1984: Principal of Betsiamites Elementary and Secondary School for the Ministry of Indian Affairs
1959–1977: Primary education in Pessamit

Other experiences
2005: Member of the National Order of Quebec
1992: Member of the Board of Directors of the Montagnais Cultural and Educational Institute (ICEM).
1989-1992: Member of the Conseil Supérieur en Education of Quebec.
1984-1985: Member of the Evaluation Group of the Masters Training Program (UQAC, September 1984 - June 1985).
1984: Organizer of Heritage Week in Betsiamites (May 13 to May 20, 1984) and responsible for the reserves: Schefferville, La Romaine, Mingan, Sept-Iles, Les Escoumins, Natashquan and Pointe-Bleue.
1981–1987: Instigator and promoter of the pilot project (first teaching given in the Montagnais language at Betsiamites) - Ongoing project.
1972–1982: Councilor (Member of the Betsiamites Band Council):

Distinctions
2013 – Queen Elizabeth II Diamond Jubilee Medal from the hands of the MNA for Manicouagan Jonathan Genest-Jourdain
2005 – Chevaliere of the National Order of Quebec
2004 – Honorary Doctorate, University of Quebec, National Institute of Scientific Research (INRS)
1994 – Medal of the Université du Québec à Chicoutimi
1985 – Betsiamites Educational Services Centre Tribute on 25 Years of Service to Education
1979 – Indian and Northern Affairs Canada Celebrates 20 Years of Service
1967 – Canadian Centennial Medal

References

External links
Pionnière de l'éducation chez les Innus – 2015 interview with Radio-Canada 
Marcelline Picard-Kanapé, the first Innu teacher on the Côte-Nord – 2017 interview with Radio-Canada 

1941 births
Living people
20th-century Canadian educators
20th-century First Nations people
21st-century First Nations people
20th-century women educators
Canadian indigenous women academics
First Nations academics
First Nations women in politics
French Quebecers
Knights of the National Order of Quebec
Indigenous Canadian feminists
Innu people
People from Côte-Nord
Université du Québec à Chicoutimi alumni
Wyandot
20th-century Canadian women